Denmark–Ukraine relations refers to the current and historical relations between Denmark and Ukraine. Denmark recognized Ukraine on 31 December 1991, and diplomatic relations were established on 12 February 1992.

Denmark supports Ukraine in line with the Eastern Partnership and has contributed to reforming various Ukrainian sectors. Denmark has been described as a key partner for Ukraine.

Denmark is a member of the European Union, which Ukraine applied for in 2022. Both countries are members of the Council of Europe and the United Nations.

Early ties
In 1918 or 1919, Denmark recognized the Ukrainian People's Republic.

From 1919 - 1991, Ukraine was part of the Soviet Union as the Ukrainian Soviet Socialist Republic. Denmark on the other hand is member of the Western Bloc, being a founding member of NATO.

Modern ties 
During the Danish Presidency of the Council of the European Union, Prime Minister of Denmark Anders Fogh Rasmussen welcomed Ukraine in the European Union but said that Ukraine needed more reforms before they can join the European Union. In 2004, to strengthen ties with Ukraine, Denmark opened an embassy in Ukraine.

After the 2022 Russian invasion of Ukraine Denmark provided a total 257 million Euors worth of support for Ukraine, both in millitary and non-millitary funds. Denmark supported the EU membership candidate status for Ukraine.

High level visits
Danish Foreign Minister Niels Helveg Petersen visited Ukraine in September 1998, during the visit, both countries signed an intergovernmental protocol on financial cooperation. In March 2007, President of Ukraine Viktor Yushchenko visited Denmark, to hold meetings with Danish officials about signing energy, agricultural and food cooperation agreements. In May 2011, Ukrainian Prime Minister Mykola Azarov invited Crown Prince Frederik to Ukraine.

Military cooperation

Operation "Northern Falcon" (2009)
Ukraine assisted with an Ilyushin Il-76.

Assistance to the Armed Forces of Ukraine (2014–2022) 
Denmark began taking part in the NATO-led capacity building of the Armed Forces of Ukraine in 2014 after the War in Donbas. Denmark has taken part in the British-led training mission Operation Interflex after 2015 with a staff office, training teams, translators. Moreover, soldiers from the Royal Danish Navy and Royal Danish Army have trained Ukrainian soldiers as well.

In January 2022, Denmark supported Ukraine with 164 million DKK to support the Ukrainian defense as the Russo-Ukrainian crisis was continuing.

Resident diplomatic missions
 Denmark has an embassy in Kyiv.
 Ukraine has an embassy in Copenhagen.

See also
 Foreign relations of Denmark
 Foreign relations of Ukraine

References

 
Ukraine
Bilateral relations of Ukraine